Wolford Elementary School may refer to:
 Earl and Lottie Wolford Elementary School - McKinney, Texas - McKinney Independent School District
 Edith Wolford Elementary School - Colorado Springs, Colorado - Academy School District 20
 Wolford Public School - Wolford, North Dakota - Wolford School District